Rats is the third studio album by Canadian rock singer/songwriter Sass Jordan, released on Aquarius Records (Canada) March 1994.

Personnel
Band
Sass Jordan – lead vocals, bass, producer, backing vocals
Stevie Salas – bass, electric guitar, mixing, producer, string arrangements, acoustic guitar, backing vocals
Ian Moore – electric guitar, slide guitar, backing vocals
Carmine Rojas – bass
Brian Tichy – drums
Rei Atsumi – Mellotron, Hammond organ, piano
Tal Bergman – percussion
George Clinton – talking, backing vocals
Allen Kamai – bass
Jamie Wood – harmonica
Vince Ruby – backing vocals
Tony Reyes – bass, acoustic guitar, backing vocals
Tom Petersson – bass
Michael Page – bass
Johan Langlie Orchestra – strings
Richie Kotzen – backing vocals

Technical
 Jeanne Bradshaw – design and cover art 
 Stephen Marcussen – mastering
 Caroline Greyshock – photography
 Karen Dusenberry – Clothing/Wardrobe
 Pat Dorn – Coordination
 Nick DiDia – Engineer, Mixing, Producer, String Arrangements

Track listing

References

1994 albums
Sass Jordan albums
MCA Records albums